Heydon Hall is an Elizabethan house set in parkland near the village of Heydon, Norfolk, England.

The hall is Grade I listed on the National Heritage List for England, and its gardens are Grade II* listed on the Register of Historic Parks and Gardens.

Location

History
The hall was built between 1581 and 1584 for Henry Dynne, an Auditor of the Receipt of the Exchequer. From the time of Oliver Cromwell it was first owned by the Earle family being originally bought by Erasmus Earle, a Serjeant-at-law to Cromwell. An ancient oak tree at Heydon Park is said to be where Cromwell once hid from a bull, during a visit to Erasmus. A descendant, Mary, daughter of Augustine Earle married William Bulwer and it then came into the Bulwer family of Wood Dalling.

The original large park covered approximately  but has mostly been broken up.

Film location

The hall was featured in the BBC's 1996 version of The Moonstone. Part of the British film A Cock and Bull Story (2006) was filmed at the hall. In spring 2021, two days of filming towards This England took place in the grounds.

References

External links
Heydon Hall

Country houses in Norfolk
Elizabethan architecture
Grade I listed buildings in Norfolk
Grade I listed houses
Grade II* listed parks and gardens in Norfolk
Houses completed in 1584
Tourist attractions in Norfolk
Heydon, Norfolk